Valentin Sysoyev may refer to:

 Valentin Borisovich Sysoyev (b. 1948), Russian football coach
 Valentin Vasilyevich Sysoyev (1887 - 1971), Russian football player